The minute fruit bat (Cynopterus minutus) is a species of megabat within the family Pteropodidae. It is found in Sumatra, Java, Borneo and Sulawesi. The C. minutus is a smaller species that lives in rainforests. Continuous bimodal polyoestry has seasonal reproduction. The females of the species reproduce in synchrony, giving birth to offspring 5-7 months apart throughout two separate seasons (3–4 months apart). Postpartum oestrus occurs after each parturition. In C. minutus, both sexes reach sexual maturity at around 7 months, and females give birth for the first time at around 12 months. Females start having children not long after reaching sexual maturity, and they effectively continue having children indefinitely. Relative to other fruit bats, C. minutus have high rates of reproduction.

References

3. Donnelly, M., E. Martin, T., Cropper, O., Yusti, E., Arfian, A., Smethurst, R., Fox, C., Pryde, M., Hafirun, H., Phangurha, J., N. van der Aa, R., Hutchison, A., Karya, A., Analuddin, K., Samsudin, S., & K. Courtney Jones, S. (2021). New Species Records from Buton Island, South East Sulawesi, including Regional Range Extensions. Barbastella, 14(1), 14–32. https://doi.org/10.14709/barbj.14.1.2021.03 

4. Kofron, C. P. (1997). Reproduction of two species of congeneric fruit bats (cynopterus) in Brunei, Borneo. Journal of Zoology, 243(3), 485–506. https://doi.org/10.1111/j.1469-7998.1997.tb02796.x 

5. Mubarok, H., Satuti Nur Handayani, N., Maryanto, I., & Arisuryanti, T. (2021). Karyotype variation in lesser short-nosed fruit bat Cynopterus Brachyotis (Müller 1838) from Special Region Yogyakarta, Indonesia. Biodiversitas Journal of Biological Diversity, 22(5). https://doi.org/10.13057/biodiv/d220514 

Cynopterus
Bats of Southeast Asia
Bats of Indonesia
Bats of Malaysia
Mammals of Borneo
Mammals of Brunei
Fauna of Java
Mammals of Sulawesi
Fauna of Sumatra
Least concern biota of Asia
Mammals described in 1906
Taxa named by Gerrit Smith Miller Jr.